DarwiinRemote is an application for Mac OS X v10.4 or above which allows Wii Remote to fully control applications on a Mac.  The software includes a desktop application and a developers' framework, allowing for additional functionality.  To use the software, the computer must have Bluetooth enabled.

Usage
DarwiinRemote employs most of the features of the Wii Remote.  All three accelerometers feed information to the Mac.  All of the buttons on the Wii Remote, including the Nunchuk  and classic controller attachments, can be used, and the control stick position can be displayed, but it is not possible to use the control stick to control anything.  The rumble features and LEDs are fully programmable.  In addition, DarwiinRemote can accept the infrared signals from the Wii Sensor Bar.  However, to use this feature, the bar must be plugged into a powered socket on a Wii console, or it must be a battery-powered model.  One can also, however, use a string of infrared LEDs or a single IR LED from a remote control instead of a sensor bar.

Button mapping
By editing the source code or customizing the application's preferences, the buttons on the remote can emulate any key combination on the Mac. By default, the Remote's buttons correspond with the following keys:

References

External links

Macintosh-only software
Wii controllers